Luther Franklin Roy (July 29, 1902 – July 24, 1963) was a pitcher in Major League Baseball.

Roy was born in Ooltewah, Tennessee.  He pitched from 1924 to 1929 with four different Major League teams.

Luther Roy died, aged 60, in Grand Rapids, Michigan.

References

External links

1902 births
1963 deaths
Major League Baseball pitchers
Brooklyn Robins players
Cleveland Indians players
Chicago Cubs players
Philadelphia Phillies players
Baseball players from Tennessee
Chattanooga Lookouts players
New Orleans Pelicans (baseball) players
Kansas City Blues (baseball) players
Baltimore Orioles (IL) players
Knoxville Smokies players
People from Ooltewah, Tennessee
Nashville Vols players